The Hallicrafters SX-28 "Super Skyrider" is an American shortwave communications receiver that was produced between 1940 and 1946 that saw wide use by amateur radio, government and military services.

History
 
In July 1940, the Hallicrafters Company announced the SX-28 "Super Skyrider", the result of a development effort by 12 staff engineers and analysis of more than 600 reports that included input from U.S. government engineers, commercial users, and amateur radio operators. The SX-28's distinctive art deco styling was considered sleek and strikingly modern in 1940. The radio frequency coverage was 550 kHz (0.55 MHz) to 43 MHz in six bands. The SX-28 included an Amplified AVC, a Lamb Noise Silencer, Calibrated bandspread, and Push-Pull audio output. The SX-28 was known for its high fidelity audio together with high sensitivity, stability and selectivity, and good purchase value.
 
The SX-28 saw use by various branches of U.S. and allied military and intelligence agencies during World War II. SX-28 and Hallicrafters S-27 and S-36 receivers were often rack mounted in British government listening posts and secret listening stations for monitoring German radar and communications during the war such as Beaumanor Hall in the English Midlands where German and Italian encrypted radio messages were sent to Bletchley Park for decoding. A number of the receivers were sent to the Soviet Union as a part of the Lend Lease Act, subsequently modified to accommodate Russian tubes.

Hallicrafters published that 50,000 SX-28 and SX-28A's had been built by the end of its production run in 1946, however the serial numbers appear to indicate a production figure of half, approximately 27,500 receivers. Many of the SX-28/28A's that exist today are in the hands of vintage amateur radio collectors and amateur radio operators.

The "Skyrider" name
 
The name "Skyrider" was intended to bestow an aura of exotic adventure to Hallicrafters products and had a long history with the company. The first Hallicrafters set to be dubbed with the name was the 1932 S-1.

Variations

Variations and special versions of the SX-28 were produced over the years. During World War II, Hallicrafters continued to redesign portions of the SX-28.

Specialty versions
AN/GRR-2 - introduced in February 1944 became the U.S. Navy SX-28A, a ruggedized unit built for U.S. Army Signal Corps and U.S. Navy use.

See also
BC-348
Hammarlund Super Pro
National HRO
R-390A

References

General references
de Hensler, Max. The Hallicrafters Story. Charleston, West Virginia: ARCA Press, 1988
Moore, Raymond. Communications Receivers, Fourth Edition. La Belle, Florida: RSM Communications, 1997
Osterman, Fred. Shortwave Receivers Past and Present. Reynoldsburg, Ohio: Universal Radio Research, 1998
Dachis, Chuck. Radios by Hallicrafters. Atglen, Pennsylvania: Schiffer Books for Collectors, 1999
SX-28 and SX-28A Manuals, VOLs. XII and XVI, Riders Perpetual Troubleshooting Manual
AN/GRR-2  Manual, Army # TM-11-874, military SX-28A
QST, July,1940 to 1946
ARRL Handbook 1946

External links
Western Historic Radio Museum, The Hallicrafters SX-28, A pre-war masterpiece

Amateur radio receivers
Military radio systems of the United States
World War II American electronics
Military equipment introduced from 1940 to 1944